Bakairí (Bacairí) is a Cariban language, spoken by the Bakairi people in the state of Mato Grosso in Brazil.

Phonology 
The consonant and vowel inventories for Eastern Bakairí are shown below.

Syntax 
Baikarí word order is either subject–object–verb or object–verb–subject.

Notes

References 

 
 

Languages of Brazil
Cariban languages